Mariano Navarro Rubio (14 November 1913 – 3 November 2001) was a Spanish politician who served as minister of finance between 1957 and 1965, during the Francoist dictatorship. He was a member of the Opus Dei.

References

20th-century Spanish politicians
1913 births
2001 deaths
Economy and finance ministers of Spain
Government ministers during the Francoist dictatorship
Governors of the Bank of Spain